is a Japanese athlete. She competed in the women's 10,000 metres event at the 2019 World Athletics Championships.

References

External links
 

1992 births
Living people
Japanese female long-distance runners
Place of birth missing (living people)
World Athletics Championships athletes for Japan
Athletes (track and field) at the 2018 Asian Games
Asian Games competitors for Japan
20th-century Japanese women
21st-century Japanese women